Little Ferry Seaplane Base  is a public-use seaplane base located one nautical mile (1.852 km) east of the central business district of the borough of Little Ferry on the Hackensack River in Bergen County, New Jersey, United States.  The base is privately owned.

Facilities and aircraft 
It has one runway designated 01/19 with a water surface measuring 5,500 by 150 feet (1,676 x 45 m).

For the 12-month period ending December 31, 2014 the base had 0 aircraft operations. At that time 0 aircraft were based there.

References

External links

Airports in New Jersey
Little Ferry, New Jersey
Seaplane bases in the United States
Transportation buildings and structures in Bergen County, New Jersey